Buchon may refer to:
 Buchón or Hispano Aviación HA-1112-M1L
 Bucheon or Buchon, a city in South Korea
 Mount Buchon a mountain range in San Luis Obispo County, California

People:
 Jean Alexandre Buchon (1791 - 1849), French scholar
Claude Buchon (born 1949), French cyclist

See also
Buchan (disambiguation)
Buchen (disambiguation)